Epibator insularis is a species of lizard in the family Scincidae. It is found in New Caledonia.

References

Epibator
Skinks of New Caledonia
Endemic fauna of New Caledonia
Reptiles described in 2019
Taxa named by Ross Allen Sadlier
Taxa named by Léo Debar
Taxa named by Mikhail Chavis
Taxa named by Aaron M. Bauer
Taxa named by Hervé Jourdan
Taxa named by Todd R. Jackman